Mocquard's Madagascar ground gecko (Paroedura bastardi) is a species of lizard in the family Gekkonidae. The species is endemic to Madagascar.

Etymology
The specific name, bastardi, is in honor of French paleontologist Eugène Joseph Bastard (1865–1910).

Geographic range
P. bastardi is found in western and southern Madagascar.

Habitat

Description

Reproduction
P. bastardi is oviparous.

References

Further reading
Dixon JR, Kroll JC (1974). "Resurrection of the Generic Name Paroedura for the Phyllodactyline Geckos of Madagascar, and Description of a New Species". Copeia 1974 (1): 24–30. (Paroedura bastardi, new combination).
Glaw F, Vences M (2006). A Field Guide to the Amphibians and Reptiles of Madagascar, Third Edition. Cologne, Germany: Vences & Glaw Verlag. 496 pp. .
Mocquard F (1900). "Diagnose d'espèces nouvelles de Reptiles de Madagascar ". Bulletin du Muséum nationale d'Histoire naturelle, Paris 6: 345–348. (Phyllodactylus bastardi, new species, p. 346). (in French).
Rösler H (2000). "Kommentierte Liste der rezent, subrezent und fossil bekannten Geckotaxa (Reptilia: Gekkonomorpha)". Gekkota 2: 28–153. (Paroedura bastardi, p. 100). (in German).

Paroedura
Reptiles of Madagascar
Reptiles described in 1900